Hermann Wraschtil (July 15, 1879 – November 9, 1950) was an Austrian track and field athletes who competed in the 1900 Summer Olympics.

At the Summer Olympics 1900 in Paris he participated in two events. In the 1500 metres race he finished sixth and in the 2500 metre steeplechase race he finished fifth.

References

External links

 Short biography 

1879 births
1950 deaths
Austrian male middle-distance runners
Austrian male steeplechase runners
Athletes (track and field) at the 1900 Summer Olympics
Olympic athletes of Austria
Place of birth missing
Place of death missing